Mal Kelapa Gading (English: Kelapa Gading Mall) is a shopping and entertainment center located in Kelapa Gading, Jakarta, Indonesia.

History

Mall Kelapa Gading comprises several parts namely Mall Kelapa Gading 1,2,3,5, La Piazza and Gading Food City.

Mal Kelapa Gading opened in 1990, then known as Kelapa Gading Plaza. The mall went through a phase 2 extension in 1995. On April 10, 2003, Mal Kelapa Gading opened Phase 3. This phase brought the total mall size to 130,000 m² and a total of 600 stores in the mall. 

Mal Kelapa Gading is  organized by sections. A section for clothing (The Catwalk), teenage shopping area (Fashion Hub), and wedding shopping needs (Bridal World), kids Safari edutainment (education and entertainment) facility that provides playground for kids and one stop shopping service. 
In addition, Mal Kelapa Gading has 2 food sections, with cafes in the Gourmet Walk and a 6000 m² food-court in Food Temptation.

The mall complex includes La Piazza, a structure dedicated to restaurants and cafes. The mall also provides entertainment facilities including a Gading 21 cinema, Timezone games gallery and a 24-lane bowling Viva bowling alley.

Ownership
The shopping centre is owned and operated by PT Summarecon Agung Tbk., a property company listed on the Indonesia Stock Exchange.

Structure
Mal Kelapa Gading has a total gross area of 130,000 m² on three floors. There are over 600 tenants, more than 30 fashion boutiques, 6,000 m² of food court, three cinemas and several other entertainment facilities.

See also

List of shopping malls in Indonesia
 Kelapa Gading

References

Shopping malls in Jakarta
North Jakarta